The Jewish Educational Trade School (JETS) is a technical college and high school for young Jewish men. It is in the San Fernando Valley region of Greater Los Angeles.

References

Schools in Los Angeles County, California